Austria was represented by the band Mess consisting of Fritz (real name Michael Scheickl) and Elisabeth 'Lizzi' Engstler. They performed their song "Sonntag", at the 1982 Eurovision Song Contest, which took place in Harrogate on 24 April. Mess was the winner of the Austrian national final for the contest, held on 25 March. The song was chosen through a national final organised by broadcaster ORF.

Before Eurovision

National final 
The final was held at the ORF-Zentrum in Vienna, hosted by Andreas Steppan. The winning song was chosen by 290 people who voted by telephone.

At Eurovision 
On the night of the final Mess performed 10th in the running order, following Sweden and preceding Belgium. At the close of voting "Sonntag" placing Austria 9th of the 18 entries. The Austrian jury awarded its 12 points to the United Kingdom (but, curiously enough, only awarded eventual winner Germany a single point; the only other country that gave Germany less than six points - Luxembourg, who awarded Germany no points - also gave the United Kingdom their top score).

Voting

References 

1982
Countries in the Eurovision Song Contest 1982
Eurovision